The Guia Fortress is a 17th-century colonial military fort, chapel, and lighthouse complex in São Lázaro, Macau. The complex is part of the UNESCO World Heritage Site Historic Centre of Macau.

The view of the fortress and the lighthouse has been blocked by the Liaison Office of the Central People's Government in the Macao Special Administrative Region since 2010. Local citizens and scholars criticised that such a case proved that the Macao government had ignored the conservation of heritage in urban planning.

Architecture

The fort and chapel were constructed between the 1622 and 1638. The fort was already partly built during the unsuccessful attempt by the Netherlands to capture colonial Macau from Portugal, providing an advantageous firing position for defending against naval attacks.

Lighthouse

The lighthouse was constructed between 1864 and 1865, the first western style lighthouse in the Far East, southeast Asia or on the China coast. The complex was built upon the highest point on the Macau peninsula, Guia Hill, and named after the same location. Today, the site is a tourist destination.

Chapel

The chapel (Portuguese: Capela de Nossa Senhora da Guia; Chinese: 聖母雪地殿教堂) was built around 1622 inside the Guia Fortress.

In 1998, frescoes were uncovered in the chapel during routine conservation work, representing both western and Chinese themes.

Threat

In 2007, local residents of Macao wrote a letter to UNESCO complaining about construction projects around the World Heritage Site Guia Lighthouse (focal height ), including the headquarter of the Liaison Office of the Central People's Government in the Macao Special Administrative Region. UNESCO then issued a warning to the Macau government, which led former Chief Executive Edmund Ho to sign a notice regulating height restrictions on buildings around the site.

In 2015, the New Macau Association submitted a report to UNESCO claiming that the government had failed to protect Macao's cultural heritage against threats by urban development projects. One of the main examples of the report is that the headquarter of the Liaison Office of the Central People's Government, which is located on the Guia foothill and obstructs the view of the Guia Fortress (one of the world heritages symbols of Macao). One year later, Roni Amelan, a spokesman from UNESCO press service, said that the UNESCO has asked China for information and is still waiting for a reply.

In 2016, the Macau government approved an  construction limit for the residential project, which reportedly goes against the city's regulations on the height of buildings around world heritage site Guia Lighthouse.

Professor at Stanford University Dr. Ming K. Chan and professor at University of Macau Dr. Eilo Yu commented the Guia Lighthouse case proved that the Macao government had ignored the conservation of heritage in urban planning.

See also

Fortaleza do Monte, another Portuguese fort in Macau
List of lighthouses in Macau
List of oldest buildings and structures in Macau

References

External links
English site for Macau Heritage
Future of historic Guia Lighthouse
3D video made by an anonymous architect shows the future of Outer Harbor with several tall buildings in front of Guia Lighthouse

Forts in Macau
Portuguese forts
Lighthouses in China
Historic Centre of Macau
Religious buildings and structures completed in 1638
Lighthouses completed in 1865
Military history of Macau
Portuguese Macau
World Heritage Sites in China
1638 establishments in China
1638 establishments in the Portuguese Empire
17th-century establishments in Macau
1865 establishments in China
1865 establishments in the Portuguese Empire
19th-century establishments in Macau
Portuguese colonial architecture in China